Hal Harvey Fieberling (born Hal David Britton; December 10, 1918 – January 15, 1998) known professionally as Hal Baylor, was an American  actor, probably best known for his role as Pvt. 'Sky' Choynski in the film Sands of Iwo Jima.

In 1956, he portrayed “Dolph Timble” in James Arness's TV Western Series Gunsmoke in the episode “Hack Prine” (S1E26).

In addition to his acting career, he was also a boxer, with a record of 52-5 as an amateur and 16-8-3 as a professional.

Baylor was born in San Antonio, Texas, and died in Los Angeles.

Partial filmography

 Joe Palooka in Winner Take All (1948) - Sammy Talbot
 The Set-Up (1949) - Tiger Nelson (as Hal Fieberling)
 The Crooked Way (1949) - Coke
 Yes Sir, That's My Baby (1949) - Pudge Flugeldorfer
 Sands of Iwo Jima (1949) - Pvt. 'Sky' Choynski (as Hal Fieberling)
 Destination Big House (1950) - Bill Storm (uncredited)
 Dial 1119 (1950) - Lt. 'Whitey' Tallman
 Joe Palooka in the Squared Circle (1950) - Pinky Thompson
 For Heaven's Sake (1950) - Expectant Father (uncredited)
 Inside Straight (1951) - Foreman (uncredited)
 Up Front (1951) - Smitty (uncredited)
 The Guy Who Came Back (1951) - Navy Man (uncredited)
 Jim Thorpe – All-American (1951) - player (uncredited)
 The Wild Blue Yonder (1951) - Sgt. Eric Nelson
 Fort Osage (1952) - Olaf Christensen (uncredited)
 Down Among the Sheltering Palms (1952) - Soldier (uncredited)
 Breakdown (1952) - Joe Thompson - champ
 Big Jim McLain (1952) - Poke
 One Minute to Zero (1952) - Pvt. Jones (uncredited)
 The Sun Shines Bright (1953) - Rufe Ramseur Jr.
 Woman They Almost Lynched (1953) - Zed (uncredited)
 Champ for a Day (1953) - "Soldier" Freeman
 99 River Street (1953) - Boxer Sailor Braxton (uncredited)
 Island in the Sky (1953) - Stankowski
 Hot News (1953) - Augie Grotz
 Flight Nurse (1953) - Sgt. Jimmy Case
 Prince Valiant (1954) - Prison Guard (uncredited)
 River of No Return (1954) - Young Punk (uncredited)
 Tobor the Great (1954) - Max
 This Is My Love (1954) - Eddie Collins
 Black Tuesday (1954) - Lou Mehrtens
 Outlaw Treasure (1955) - Ace Harkey
 Away All Boats (1956) - Chaplain Hughes
 The Burning Hills (1956) - Braun
 Kiss Them for Me (1957) - Big Marine in Nightclub (uncredited)
 The Young Lions (1958) - Pvt. Burnecker
 Operation Petticoat (1959) - Military Police Sergeant (uncredited)
 Johnny Cool (1963) - Gambler (uncredited)
 Quick, Before It Melts (1964) - Prison Guard
 The Gnome-Mobile (1967) - Male Nurse (uncredited)
 Fitzwilly (1967) - Motorcycle Cop (uncredited)
 The Cheyenne Social Club (1970) - Barkeep - Lady of Egypt
 WUSA (1970) - Shorty
 The Barefoot Executive (1971) - Policeman
 The Grissom Gang (1971) - Chief McLaine
 Evel Knievel (1971) - Sheriff
 Pickup on 101 (1972) - Railroad cop
 Ulzana's Raid (1972) - Curtis (uncredited)
 Emperor of the North (1973) - Yardman's Helper
 One Little Indian (1973) - Branigan
 Herbie Rides Again (1974) - Demolition Truck Driver
 The Bears and I (1974) - Foreman
 A Boy and His Dog (1975) - Michael
 Cornbread, Earl and Me (1975) - Mr. Wilson
 Hustle (1975) - Police Captain

Partial television credits
 The Lone Ranger (1950-1954) - Judd Collins / Notch Brice / Bert Devlin / Glenn Bolton / Gus
 Four Star Playhouse (1954-1955) - Cal / Jamison
 The Life and Legend of Wyatt Earp (1955-1958) - Sam Wilson / Bill Thompson / Jeb Callum
 Cheyenne (1956-1960) - Rowdy Shane / Jed Rayner / Joe Barnum / Duke / Turk Moylan
 Gunsmoke (1957) - Mike
 The Silent Service (1957-1958) - Exec. Officer Bob Ison / Calhoun / Lieut. Robert L. Ison
 Have Gun – Will Travel (1958-1963) - Tagg - Farmer / Floyd Perrin / Bryan Sykes
 Death Valley Days (1958-1970) - Stokes LaFever / Captain Randolph / Wes Adams / Web Hardy / Trenner / Lance / Sheriff Ryan / Hughie Snow / Joe Sweigert / Ben Poole / Gus Mahoney / Jed / Buck Jarrico
 26 Men (1958-1959) - Slats Scarsted / Roper / Charlie Daggett / Sykes
 Laramie (1959-1963) - Hub Ballard / Samson / Ben - Mountain Man / Beamer / 2nd Bar Patron / Kincaid / Cowboy Hill
 Rawhide (1959-1965) - Jenkins / Will Gufler / Barney / Pool Player / Myles / Blacksmith
 Lawman (1959-1962) - Harlan Smith/ Poke / Mort Peters
 Maverick (1959) - Bimbo  
 Bat Masterson (1960) - Eli Fisher
 77 Sunset Strip (1960-1964) - Herky's Bouncer / Johnny Lace / Vic Felton / Hank Schmidt / Britt
 Stagecoach West (1961) - Saloon Brawler / Jim Horton / Big Jim
 Tales of Wells Fargo (1962) - Hondo
 Perry Mason (1963-1965) - Jack David / First Truck Driver / Proprietor
 The Virginian (1963-1970) - Jethro / Bert / Corporal Jobie / 1st Miner / Sgt. Costello / Gleason / Flake
 The Addams Family (1964) - Fred in episode "Morticia the Matchmaker"
 My Favorite Martian (1964-1966) - Red / Guard / Harold
 Laredo (1966) - Mott / Tatoo
 The Big Valley (1967) - Sam Driscoll / Gabe
 Batman (1967) - Mercury
 Star Trek (1967-1968) - Guard / Policeman

References

External links
 
 

1918 births
1998 deaths
American male film actors
American male television actors
Male actors from Nebraska
Male actors from San Antonio
People from Banner County, Nebraska
20th-century American male actors
Western (genre) television actors
American male boxers
Heavyweight boxers